James Ciccone is an American actor. He appeared  in three seasons as mob boss Carmine Patriccia in the HBO television drama The Deuce.   In 2017 Ciccone appeared in the racially charged bio-pic Crown Heights which premiered in competition as a Grand Jury Nomination at the Sundance Film Festival on January 23, 2017 and won the Audience Award for U.S. Dramatic Film. In 2019, he appeared in The Kitchen, starring Melissa McCarthy and Tiffany Haddish, and the Academy Award nominated films, Joker, starring Joaquin Phoenix and Robert De Niro, and Martin Scorsese's The Irishman. In late 2021 he can be seen opposite Michael Keaton in Worth, a drama about the September 11th Victim Compensation Fund.  He has also appeared in  The Marvelous Mrs. Maisel (2022), Law & Order: Organized Crime (2023), American Horror Story (2023).

Early life
Ciccone was born in Park Slope, Brooklyn as the tenth child to Anthony Ciccone and Theresa (Merrit) Ciccone; he is of Italian and Irish descent.  The family owned a local luncheonette until 1965 when Ciccone's father died. After his father's death Ciccone's mother sold the luncheonette and moved the family to the Gravesend/Bensonhurst section of Brooklyn where she worked full-time as a waitress.  As a result, Ciccone was raised largely by his nine older siblings, two of whom had artistic influence on him. Early on in elementary school Ciccone participated in several school plays and by age 11 began playing trumpet in the music program at Public School 153, Brooklyn. For the next five years he continued studying music with Academy Award-winning composer Elliot Goldenthal. In 1977 Ciccone was accepted into the High School of Performing Arts on 46th Street, New York City. The school gained world recognition with the release of the 1980 multiple Academy Award-winning film Fame.  Ciccone studied music at Performing Arts while studying acting with Uta Hagen at HB Studio. He later earned a bachelor's degree at Marist College, Poughkeepsie, NY and graduated magna cum laude. In 2000 and 2003 respectively he earned master of divinity and doctor of ministry degrees from New York Theological Seminary. Ciccone taught briefly for St. John's University, City University of New York (CUNY), and in the graduate program at Metropolitan College of New York, before beginning a professional acting career.

Acting career
In 2006, Ciccone became a member of the small Primary Talent community theatre group housed at the 200-seat Players Theatre in Manhattan.  During this time he appeared in several productions including the lead role in Paddy Chayefsky’s Marty.  Over the next few years he was cast in a variety of unknown low-budget independent films and several student films at NYU Tish before writing and appearing in his own three short films Nothing for Nothing, Plenty of It, and Neighborhood Nonsense, the latter of which appeared in the 2010 New Filmmakers Film Festival and was featured on Funny or Die. While studying with acting coach Harold Guskin he secured his television debut in an Under-five role as Price, a card-player in the final season of the 54 year running soap, As The World Turns.  The following year in 2011 Ciccone landed a multiple day guest star role in an episode of White Collar playing the referee in an underground after-hours boxing club. In 2012 he appeared opposite Donnie Wahlberg and Jennifer Esposito in Blue Bloods and landed a recurring role as Joe Masseria's thug on HBO's Boardwalk Empire. In 2013 he worked opposite Jake McLaughlin and Erik LaRay Harvey in several scenes in an episode of  NBC's Believe, directed by Academy Award-winning director Alfonso Cuaron. Ciccone also appeared on network television opposite Debra Messing on The Mysteries of Laura and made guest star appearances as Peter O'Neil on Law & Order: Special Victims Unit. In 2015, Ciccone was cast in the guest star role of Ronald in Master of None where he worked opposite comedian Aziz Ansari (playing Dev) who employs a citizen’s arrest only to "weirdly kind of sympathize with [him]". Other  2015 Netflix roles include Cabbie opposite Charlie Cox on Daredevil and Vito in Italian Pinata on  Difficult People. Also in 2016 Ciccone appeared in the guest star role of truck-rental mobster Frank Capello on Person of Interest. In late 2016 Ciccone was cast as a guest star (Anthony) in the new CBS episodic Bull starring Michael Weatherly. In the 2017 Sundance Film Festival Ciccone appeared in the World Premiere of the racially charged bio-pic Crown Heights, which took home the Festival Audience Award for the US Dramatic competition. In 2017 Ciccone appeared in recurring roles on two major episodics: NBC's Shades of Blue, and HBO’s hit television drama The Deuce starring James Franco and Maggie Gyllenhaal. Ciccone continued to appear as mob boss Carmine Patriccia in all 3 seasons of the show. Also in 2018 Ciccone has made guest star appearances in Fox's primetime network hit, Gotham scene partnering with Robin Lord Taylor, NBC's Blacklist alongside James Spader, and a co-star appearance on ABC's Quantico where he is paired again with Jake McLaughlin. In 2019, he also starred in Martin Scorsese's The Irishman, opposite Joe Pesci and Robert De Niro.

Personal life
Ciccone has two daughters, born in 2013 and 2021.

Filmography

Notes

References

External links
 
 

Living people
People from Park Slope
American male film actors
American male television actors
American people of Irish descent
American people of Italian descent
Marist College alumni
Male actors from New York (state)
People from Gravesend, Brooklyn
Year of birth missing (living people)